David Eduardo Solari Poggio (born March 21, 1986) is an Argentine football player who currently plays as a forward.

Career
On 23 May 2019 it was confirmed, that Solari had joined ASIL Lysi for the 2019/20 season.

Personal life
Solari's parents are Eduardo Miguel Solari – a former footballer – and Alicia Susana Poggio. Hailing from a footballing family, his uncle Jorge (father-in-law of Fernando Redondo) and his brothers Santiago and Esteban were also professional players, while his sister, Liz Solari, worked as an actress.

Honours
Hapoel Ironi Kiryat Shmona
Toto Cup: 2011–12
Israeli Premier League: 2011–12

Enosis Neon Paralimni
Cypriot Second Division: 2017–18

References

External links

1986 births
Living people
Sportspeople from Barranquilla
Colombian footballers
Citizens of Argentina through descent
Argentine footballers
Argentine expatriate footballers
Venezia F.C. players
Club Atlético Independiente footballers
Olimpo footballers
C.D. ESPOLI footballers
Deportivo Táchira F.C. players
AEP Paphos FC players
Alki Larnaca FC players
Hapoel Ironi Kiryat Shmona F.C. players
F.C. Ashdod players
Maccabi Petah Tikva F.C. players
Hapoel Afula F.C. players
Othellos Athienou F.C. players
ASIL Lysi players
Enosis Neon Paralimni FC players
Argentine expatriate sportspeople in Cyprus
Expatriate footballers in Cyprus
Argentine expatriate sportspeople in Israel
Expatriate footballers in Israel
Cypriot First Division players
Cypriot Second Division players
Israeli Premier League players
Liga Leumit players
Association football forwards